Luca Moro (27 February 1973 – 14 March 2014) was an Italian racing driver from Cagliari, Italy.

Career
Moro was best known for his involvement in sports car racing, especially his participation in the 24 Hours of Le Mans. He drove one of the two Lotus LMP2 cars in 2012 at Le Mans. He had two wins, eight podiums and one pole position in his career, with his last win being with the Hope Polevision Racing team at the 2010 1000 km of Spa.

In 2006, Moro was suspended from racing for two years after testing positive for Benzoylecgonine at the 2006 FIA GT Championship.

Death
Moro was hospitalized on 6 March 2014 in Milan. He died there at the age of 41 on 15 March of an apparent brain tumor.

References

External links 
 Luca Moro career stats at drivermb.com

1973 births
2014 deaths
Italian racing drivers
European Le Mans Series drivers
Doping cases in auto racing
Deaths from brain cancer in Italy

Kolles Racing drivers
FIA World Endurance Championship drivers
Murphy Prototypes drivers
DAMS drivers